Software-defined may refer to:

 GNSS software-defined receiver
 Software Defined Perimeter
 Software-defined data center
 Software-defined infrastructure
 Software-defined mobile network
 Software-defined networking
 Software-defined protection
 Software-defined radio
 List of software-defined radios
 Software-defined storage